Beibei Station is a station on Line 6 of Chongqing Rail Transit in Chongqing municipality, China, which is the northwestern terminus of Line 6. It is located in Beibei District and opened in 2013.

Station structure

References

Railway stations in Chongqing
Railway stations in China opened in 2013
Chongqing Rail Transit stations